Sant Andreu Arenal is a Rodalies de Catalunya station in the Barcelona district of Sant Andreu. Passengers can also commute here to Barcelona Metro line 1 station Fabra i Puig and the Sant Andreu bus terminal. It is located where Avinguda Meridiana and Avinguda de Rio de Janeiro meet, by Rambla de Fabra i Puig.

Metro
Fabra i Puig (L1)

See also

List of Rodalies Barcelona railway stations
Sant Andreu Comtal railway station

References

External links
 Barcelona Sant Andreu Arenal listing at Rodalies de Catalunya website
 Information and photos of the station at Trenscat.com 

Railway stations in Barcelona
Transport in Sant Andreu
Rodalies de Catalunya stations

ca:Estació de Sant Andreu Arenal/Fabra i Puig
es:Estación de San Andrés Arenal/Fabra i Puig